Epicrocis vicinella is a species of snout moth in the genus Epicrocis. It was described by Joseph de Joannis in 1927. It is found in Mozambique.

References

Moths described in 1927
Phycitini
Endemic fauna of Mozambique
Lepidoptera of Mozambique
Moths of Sub-Saharan Africa